Richard Flavin (born 27 December 1878) is an Irish Gaelic footballer who played as a goalkeeper for the Cork senior team.

Flavin made his first appearance for the team during the 1905 championship and was a regular member of the starting fifteen for a number of seasons until his retirement during the 1909 championship. During that time he won two Munster medals but failed to capture an All-Ireland medal.

At club level Flavin played with Youghal.

References

1878 births
Year of death missing
Youghal Gaelic footballers
Cork inter-county Gaelic footballers
Gaelic football goalkeepers
People from Youghal